JDS Kikuzuki (DD-165) was the second ship of Takatsuki-class destroyerss. She was commissioned on 27 March 1968.

Construction and career
Kikuzuki was laid down on March 15, 1966 at Mitsubishi Heavy Industries Nagasaki Shipyard & Machinery Works as No. 2305, a 3,000-ton type A II security ship planned in 1964 based on the Second Defense Build-up Plan. Launched on March 25, commissioned on March 27, 1968, and was incorporated into the 1st Escort Corps, which was newly formed under the 1st Escort Corps group on the same day, along with JDS Takatsuki and deployed to Kure.

From June 30, 1970, he participated in the first practicing voyage around the world as a Maritime Self-Defense Force with the training ship JDS Katori. After the damage accident of the main turbine occurred on October 30, just before the arrival at Colombo Harbor in Ceylon, he sailed on one axis only on the port side and returned to Japan on November 18.

On February 1, 1971, the 1st Escort Corps was reorganized under the 2nd Escort Corps group.

In 1973, participated in a practicing voyage to the ocean.

From May 12 to June 27, 1977, participated in Hawaii dispatch training with the escort ship JDS Mochizuki, the submarine JDS Makishio, and eight P-2J aircraft.

From November 1 to December 17, 1980, participated in Hawaii dispatch training with the escort vessels JDS Tachikaze, JDS Mochizuki, and eight P-2Js.

On March 30, 1983, the 1st Escort Corps was transferred to the 4th Escort Corps, and the homeport was transferred to Yokosuka. Also, from June 15 of the same year, she participated in a practicing voyage around the world.

It has undergone a modernization refurbishment (FRAM) since May 30, 1985, which was completed on December 26, 1986.

On March 25, 1993, he was transferred to the Maizuru District Force 2nd Escort Corps, and the homeport was transferred to Maizuru.

On March 24, 1997, the 2nd escort was renamed the 24th escort due to the revision of the corps number.

Decommissioned on November 6, 2003. The total number of voyages has reached 67,678 hours, and the total voyage has reached 791,213.4 nautical miles (36.5 laps around the earth), during which time he has participated in three practicing voyages (two of which are around the world).

Gallery

Citations

References

 石橋孝夫『海上自衛隊全艦船 1952-2002』（並木書房、2002年）
 『世界の艦船 増刊第66集 海上自衛隊全艦艇史』（海人社、2004年）
 『世界の艦船 第750集』海人社、2011年11月号

1967 ships
Takatsuki-class destroyers
Ships built by Mitsubishi Heavy Industries